The LIBIS 180 is a Slovenian sporty three-seater mixed-construction aircraft, mostly wooden with a tail wheel, designed and produced at LIBIS aircraft during Yugoslavian period.

It was used for training, towing gliders, for tourist flights and throwing skydivers. LIBIS 180 represented the further development of the popular school KB-6 Matajur, but was more demanding to fly than the KB-6, because it didn't have an aerodynamic twist to the wing it was difficult to land and did not forgive pilot mistakes at low speed. LIBIS 180 was the first aircraft produced in Yugoslavia, using plastic materials: the bonnet, wing tips and propeller cap were made of glass fibers. The plane has a seat arrangement: two at the front one behind, and a fourth fuel tank is a fuel tank. 

The sole LIBIS 180 (291-11/YU-CVR) has been preserved and is being restored to air-worthy condition at the Maribor aviation centre.

Specifications (LIBIS 180, 1966)

See also

References

http://www.2r.si/slovenska-motorna-letala/220-libis-180

http://www.opensoaring.com/Zgodovina/Obnovljeno/obnovljeno_libis180.html

https://issuu.com/delfin101/docs/krila_1_1984

LIBIS aircraft